State of play is a British English expression meaning "the present situation". It may also refer to:

 State of Play (TV serial), a 2003 BBC political thriller serial
 State of Play (film), a 2009 American film based on the BBC series
 State of Play (band), a 1980s band that preceded 1990s British band Curve
 State of Play (conference series), a series of conferences which discussed the intersection of virtual worlds and real world laws and economies (2003–2009)
 State of Play, a series of livestream presentations by Sony Interactive Entertainment; it mainly focus on titles for the PlayStation brand.